Scelidotoma is a genus of sea snails, marine gastropod mollusks in the family Fissurellidae, the keyhole limpets and slit limpets.

Species
Species within the genus Scelidotoma include:
Scelidotoma bella (Gabb, 1865)

References

External links
 To ITIS
 To World Register of Marine Species

Fissurellidae
Monotypic gastropod genera